Toni Jo Henry  (née Annie Beatrice McQuiston; January 3, 1916 – November 28, 1942) was the only woman ever to be executed in Louisiana's electric chair. Married to Claude 'Cowboy' Henry, she decided to break her husband out of jail where he was serving a fifty-year sentence in the Texas State Penitentiary for murder. Together with Harold Burks, she took a ride with Joseph P. Calloway, whom they then robbed and murdered. Toni Jo Henry was convicted and sentenced to death. After three trials, she was executed by electrocution on November 28, 1942. Her case generated several popular books and films including A Savage Wisdom and Stone Justice.

Biography
Henry was born Annie Beatrice McQuiston in Shreveport, Louisiana on January 3, 1916, the third of five children. She lived with her grandmother for a while, while her mother was ill. Her mother died of tuberculosis when Henry was six years of age. After her mother died she lived with her father and stepmother, although always wanted to return to living with her grandmother.

Henry worked part-time in a macaroni factory at thirteen but was sacked when the manager found out there was tuberculosis in her family. After her father gave her a beating for losing her job, she left home and became a street hustler and prostitute, changing her name to Toni Jo Hood. She later worked in a brothel in Shreveport's red-light district. Henry was addicted to cocaine at this time and also plied her trade in other parts of Louisiana and South Texas.

In 1939, she met Claude Henry, one of her customers, in Austin, Texas. A down-on-his-luck prize fighter, Cowboy, as he was known, fell in love with the young woman.  Married on November 25, 1939, the couple honeymooned in southern California.

Upon returning from California, Claude Henry was arrested for the murder of a former San Antonio police officer, Arthur Sinclair, prior to their marriage. He was found guilty in January 1940 and sentenced to fifty years in the Texas State Penitentiary at Huntsville.

Murder of Joseph P. Calloway
Toni Jo then began contemplating plans to break her husband out of Huntsville Prison. She recruited an accomplice, an ex-con and army deserter named Harold 'Arkie' Burks, who claimed to know the layout of the penitentiary. The pair devised a plan to rob a bank, in hopes of securing money to aid in breaking Claude Henry out of jail. Two teenagers were persuaded to break into a gun store and steal guns and ammunition for them to use. Joseph P. Calloway was delivering a Ford Coupe to a friend when he happened upon Toni Jo and Arkie Burks who were hitchhiking. Unaware of their plan, he offered to give the two a ride.

As they drove past Jennings, Louisiana, Toni Jo and Arkie robbed Calloway at gunpoint. They proceeded to lock him in the trunk of his car and drive down a country road. The duo planned to use the Ford as a getaway vehicle; however, they soon decided to pull the car over on a country track. Calloway was ordered out of the car. He was then ushered into a field and told to strip as Henry wanted a change of clothes for her husband when they broke him out of prison. Calloway was then shot once in the head with a .32 caliber revolver and died at the scene.

When they reached Camden, Arkansas, Arkie became concerned about how far Henry would go to break her husband out of prison and left her, taking the car.

Arrests, trials and appeals
Henry returned to Shreveport by bus, where she sought refuge with her aunt, Emma, and told her she had murdered a man near Lake Charles, Louisiana. The aunt contacted her brother, who was a Louisiana State trooper, and Henry was arrested. She was later interviewed by a Shreveport police officer, during which she confessed to the murder and disclosed the location of the body.

Her first trial was held from March 27–29, 1940 at Calcasieu Courthouse. Because of Henry's good looks, the possibility of the death penalty and the severity of the charges, the trial gained much press coverage. She claimed that Burks was the one who fired the fatal shot, but after deliberating for six hours, the jury convicted her and sentenced her to death by hanging. Burks was later convicted and sentenced to death. Toni Jo appealed and was granted a new trial on the grounds that publicity surrounding the trial prejudiced the outcome.

The second trial took place in February 1941. Unlike in the first trial, Burks took the stand and testified against Toni Jo. After an hour of deliberations, she was again convicted and sentenced to death. She again appealed and was granted a new trial.

The third trial was held in January 1942. Toni Jo was again convicted and sentenced to death. She appealed, but this time her appeal was denied. An appeal to the Governor, Sam H. Jones, for clemency also failed.

Execution
While Henry was incarcerated at Lake Charles Prison, she was befriended by Father Wayne Richard, head of a local Catholic parish. He would eventually baptize her.

During the time Henry was being tried, Louisiana changed its method of execution from hanging to death by electrocution, the sentence being carried out on November 28, 1942, in the basement of Calcasieu Parish courthouse. The portable electric chair was later used at Burks' execution in March 1943. The district attorney was Griffin T. Hawkins of Lake Charles. Father Richard was present at her execution and would officiate her burial, days later. Four days prior to her execution, Claude Henry escaped from prison to see his wife one last time and was recaptured in Beaumont, Texas. Soon afterwards, he was paroled due to ill health. He was killed by a café owner on July 15, 1945, in Dallas, while out on parole.

Books and film
The radio show Gangbusters serialized Toni Jo's story in an episode that aired in February 1943.

A Savage Wisdom, a novel by Norman German, was inspired by the life, crimes and legends of Toni Jo Henry. The book is fiction, a novel categorized in the subgenre of "alternative history." It changes certain facts of the historical woman's life and posits what might have happened under different circumstances.

Henry's story is the focus of the 2013  film entitled The Pardon, which was shot on location in Shreveport. It stars actress Jaime King as Toni Jo Henry. John Hawkes plays Arkie Burks, with TJ Thyne, Jason Lewis, Leigh Whannell, and Tim Guinee. Tom Anton is the producer and director.

On September 10, 2016, Toni Jo's story was profiled in the third episode for the tenth season of Deadly Women, titled "Bad to the Bone".

In 2016, another biography about Henry, Stone Justice by Lyn Morgan and Debi King McMartin, was published.

References

Bibliography
 
 
 
 

1916 births
1942 deaths
American female murderers
American people executed for murder
People from Shreveport, Louisiana
Executed American women
People executed by Louisiana by electric chair
20th-century executions by Louisiana
American prostitutes
People convicted of murder by Louisiana
20th-century executions of American people
Executed people from Louisiana
1940 murders in the United States
Catholics from Louisiana